Friends Lake is a lake located south of Chestertown, New York. Fish species present in the lake are smallmouth bass, sunfish, largemouth bass, yellow perch, and brown bullhead. There is access at the inns and lodges around the lake.

References

Lakes of New York (state)
Lakes of Warren County, New York